The United States Department of Defense acknowledges holding two Indonesian detainees in Guantanamo.
A total of 778 detainees have been held in extrajudicial detention in the Guantanamo Bay detention camps, in Cuba since the camps opened on January 11, 2002,
The camp population peaked in 2004 at approximately 660.  Only nineteen new detainees, all "high value detainees" have been transferred there since the United States Supreme Court's ruling in Rasul v. Bush.  As of September 2009 the camp population stands at approximately 223.

On September 5, 2006, the only Indonesian in Guantanamo, Riduan Isamuddin, also known as "Hambali", was transferred to Guantanamo from the CIA's network of secret interrogation centers.

References